The men's trap event at the 2019 European Games in Minsk, Belarus took place from 22 to 23 June at the Sporting Club.

Schedule
All times are FET (UTC+03:00)

Records

Results

Qualification
The qualification round took place on 22 and 23 June to determine the qualifiers for the finals.

Final
The final round took place on 23 June to determine the final classification.

References

Men's trap